Winsu (Quechua for firstborn child, also spelled Huinso) is mountain in the Cordillera Central in the Andes of Peru which reaches a height of approximately . It is located in the Lima Region, Yauyos Province, on the border of the districts of Miraflores and Vitis.

References 

Mountains of Lima Region
Mountains of Peru